The National Order of Labour was an Order of Merit of the Kingdom of Bulgaria from 1945 to 1946, and of the People's Republic of Bulgaria from 1946 to 1990. It came in three grades.

Royal Order

References

http://www.medals.org.uk/bulgaria/peoples-republic/bulgaria-pr017.htm

Orders, decorations, and medals of Bulgaria